The Central Delaware SA Future was a North American professional soccer team based in Dover, Delaware. Founded in 2005, the team played in Women's Premier Soccer League (WPSL), a national amateur league at the third tier of the American Soccer Pyramid. The team ceased operation after the 2010 season.

Central Delaware SA Future's home was Wolverine Stadium, located on the campus of Wesley College in the city of Dover.  Central Delaware SA Future was a former sister club to the defunct Delaware Dynasty of the USL Premier Development League.

Players

Current roster

Notable former players

Year-by-year

Honors

Competition History

Head coaches
  Seamus O'Connor (2007)
  Wayne Grocott (2008–present)

Home stadiums
 Wolverine Stadium (2005–present)

See also
 Delaware Dynasty
 Delaware Wings
 Delaware Wizards
 List of professional sports teams in Delaware

External links
 Official Site
 WPSL Central Delaware SA Future page

Women's Premier Soccer League teams
Association football clubs established in 2005
Women's soccer clubs in the United States
Soccer clubs in Delaware
2005 establishments in Delaware
2010 disestablishments in Delaware
Association football clubs disestablished in 2010
Dover, Delaware
Women's sports in Delaware